The Gotha Go 244 was a transport aircraft used by the Luftwaffe during World War II.

Development
The Go 244 was the powered version of the Gotha Go 242 military glider transport. Studies for powered versions of the Go 242 began early in the design of the glider, with one early proposal being for modification to allow a single Argus As 10C engine to be temporarily attached to the nose of the glider to allow recovery back to base after use. This idea was rejected, but the alternative of a permanently powered twin-engined version was taken forward.

Three Go 242s were modified as prototypes of the powered Go 244, fitted with varying surplus radial engines. The first prototype, the Go 244 V1 was powered by two  BMW 132, while the second prototype had  Gnome-Rhône 14Ms — and the third  Shvetsov M-25 A engines, with this model of Shvetsov OKB engine design being essentially a Soviet-built Wright Cyclone American-based nine-cylinder radial. Although only the third prototype offered adequate engine out performance, the Luftwaffe had large stocks of captured Gnome engines, so this was chosen as the basis for the production conversion — usually fitted in counter-rotating pairs in production — although a few more aircraft were fitted with the BMW and Shvetsov engines.

The B series was the main production model, being based on the Go 242B with a wheeled tricycle undercarriage and with fuel and oil carried in the tailbooms. 133 were converted from existing Go 242 Bs, while a further 41 Go 244 transport aircraft were built using new air frames, before production reverted to the Go 242 glider version. Plans were also created for single-engined variants with a nose-mounted Argus As 10C or Junkers Jumo 211.

Operational history
The first examples of the Go 244 were delivered to operational units in Greece, based in Crete in March 1942. Some were also assigned to transport Geschwader in North Africa and the Eastern Front but on the former front they proved vulnerable to anti-aircraft fire and were withdrawn, being replaced by Junkers Ju 52 or Messerschmitt Me 323 aircraft.

Variants
 Go 244 A-1 - prototype, using the BMW 132 radial engine
 Go 244 B-1 - production version, with fixed landing gear
 Go 244 B-2 - B-1 with improved landing gear including a larger semi-retractable nose wheel
 Go 242 B-3 - paratroop-carrying version of B-1 with double rear doors
 Go 244 B-4 - paratroop-carrying version of B-2 with doors of B-3 and landing gear of B-2
 Go 244 B-5 - training version with dual controls

Specifications (Go 244 B-1)

See also

References
Notes

Bibliography

1940s German military transport aircraft
Go 244
High-wing aircraft
Twin piston-engined tractor aircraft